Mikhail Mikhailovich Strelnik (born 27 May 2000) is a Russian football player. He plays for Georgian club FC Samgurali Tsqaltubo.

Club career
He made his debut in the Russian Football National League for FC Krasnodar-2 on 31 July 2021 in a game against FC Olimp-Dolgoprudny.

References

External links
 
 
 Profile by Russian Football National League

2000 births
Living people
Russian footballers
Association football midfielders
FC Strogino Moscow players
FC Krasnodar-2 players
FC Olimp-Dolgoprudny players
FC Samgurali Tskaltubo players
Russian Second League players
Russian First League players
Erovnuli Liga players
Russian expatriate footballers
Expatriate footballers in Georgia (country)
Russian expatriate sportspeople in Georgia (country)